The 1999–2000 Saint Louis Billikens men's basketball team represented Saint Louis University in the 1999–2000 NCAA Division I men's basketball season. The Billikens were led by head coach Lorenzo Romar who was in his first season at Saint Louis. The team played their home games at Scottrade Center. They were a member of Conference USA. The Billikens finished the season 19–14, 7–9 in C-USA play to finish 5th in the conference standings. They won the C-USA tournament to receive an automatic bid to the NCAA tournament where they were defeated by Utah in the opening round.

Roster

Schedule and results

|-
!colspan=9 style=| Regular season

|-
!colspan=9 style=| C-USA tournament

|-
!colspan=9 style=| NCAA tournament

References

Saint Louis
Saint Louis Billikens men's basketball seasons
Saint Louis
Saint
Saint